Hashimura Togo is a 1917 American silent comedy film directed by William C. deMille and written by Marion Fairfax and Wallace Irwin. The film stars Sessue Hayakawa, Florence Vidor, Mabel Van Buren, Walter Long, Tom Forman, and Raymond Hatton. The film was released on August 19, 1917, by Paramount Pictures.

Plot

Cast

References

External links 

1917 films
1910s English-language films
Silent American comedy films
1917 comedy films
Paramount Pictures films
Films directed by William C. deMille
American black-and-white films
American silent feature films
1910s American films